USS Enhance may refer to the following ships of the United States Navy:

 USS Enhance (AM-228, canceled June 6, 1944; 
 , was a minesweeper launched 11 October 1952 and decommissioned 31 December 1991

United States Navy ship names